Melvin Alan "Mel" Karmazin (born August 24, 1943) is an American executive. He was the president of Infinity Broadcasting (formally known as CBS Radio now Entercom) and eventually became the president and CEO of CBS television . From 2004–2012, he was the CEO of Sirius Radio (re-branded Sirius XM Radio after XM merged with Sirius in 2008). In October 2012, Karmazin announced that he would be stepping down on February 1, 2013. Upon his departure, John C. Malone took over Karmazin's role at SiriusXM.

Early life and education
Karmazin was born to a Jewish family in Long Island City, Queens in New York City. His father was a taxi driver and his mother a factory worker. He first worked as a typist for an advertising firm in high school and then started selling radio ads at the age of 17. He graduated from Pace University with a bachelor's degree in business administration.

Career
After school, he worked for Columbia Broadcasting System selling ads for their radio division. In the late 1960s, Karmazin left to work for the broadcasting company Metromedia. At Metromedia, Karmazin presided over New York's WNEW-AM (now WBBR) and WNEW-FM when he was approached to run Infinity Broadcasting in 1981. Soon after he would add fellow New York stations WKTU and WFAN into Infinity's stable. WFAN morning talent Don Imus often referred to Karmazin on the air, never by name, but by the nickname "The Zen Master".

Karmazin ran Infinity for 15 years, then sold the company to Westinghouse, then the parent of CBS. For most of his career he has been known as a "Wall Street darling" for his ability to drive up the price of his various companies' stock. "The joke about him was that he was so pushy that advertisers used to buy airtime from Mel just to get him out of their office," according to a Fortune magazine article. When Infinity merged with CBS Corporation in January 1997, Karmazin would first head CBS Radio as chairman and CEO. By May of the same year he would become Chairman and Chief Executive Officer of the CBS Station Group, overseeing the network's radio and television properties. He served as President and Chief Operating Officer of CBS Corporation from April 1998 until January 1999. Viacom, a media conglomerate that includes CBS, UPN, MTV, BET, Comedy Central, Paramount Pictures and Showtime, absorbed CBS Corporation as of 2000.

As an executive of an even bigger conglomerate, Karmazin and Viacom chief Sumner Redstone had many differences, leading to Karmazin's resignation in May 2004. Karmazin later said he didn't get along with Redstone and found it difficult to be "No. 2" at a company, but particularly under Redstone. The two executives continued to snipe at each other through the media even a year after Karmazin left Viacom.

Karmazin became the CEO of Sirius in November 2004. He was a strong supporter of radio personality Howard Stern at Viacom, and Karmazin joined Sirius Radio shortly after the company signed Stern. In his first year at Sirius, Fortune magazine reported in November 2005, Karmazin reached deals with Ford and BMW to include the company's radios in their new cars and helped launch Sirius's first portable music player (both initiatives were in the wake of Sirius's rival, XM Radio, pioneering those moves). He also recruited Martha Stewart to Sirius, acquired the programming rights to NASCAR, and raised $500 million in debt financing.

Karmazin was inducted into the Broadcasting Hall of Fame, the National Radio Hall of Fame, a recipient of the National Association of Broadcasters National Radio Award, and the IRTS Gold Medal.

Karmazin's reported 2012 pay and severance from Sirius XM amounted to over $255 Million.

Personal life
In 1994, Karmazin divorced his wife Sharon Karmazin with whom he has two children: a daughter Dina Leslie Karmazin Elkins (born 1971) and a son Craig (born 1975). Sharon is the retired director of the East Brunswick Library and established the Karma Foundation dedicated to the development and enrichment of Jewish life. In June, 2001, Karmazin married his longtime executive assistant, Terry Malia. Craig Karmazin followed in his father's footsteps, when he began an internship at Infinity-owned WIP (AM) in Philadelphia in 1997. He is currently the principal owner of Good Karma Broadcasting, which owns eleven radio stations in four states, including eight sports radio stations.  Dina graduated from the University of Miami and married in 1993. Karmazin is a resident of Greenwich, Connecticut.

References

External links

 Biographical information on Karmazin at Sirius Satellite Radio Web site
 "Corporate Overview" Web page at Sirius Satellite Radio Web site
 
 Karmazin's political contributions, as tracked and updated by Newsmeat.com

1943 births
Living people
Businesspeople from Greenwich, Connecticut
American chief executives in the media industry
20th-century American Jews
Sirius Satellite Radio
Pace University alumni
People from Long Island City, Queens
Paramount Global people
21st-century American Jews